Moloy Ghatak is an Indian politician currently serving as Cabinet Minister in Government of West Bengal.

Politics 
He is an MLA of All India Trinamool Congress, elected from the Asansol Uttar constituency of Paschim Bardhaman district in the 2011, 2016 and 2021 West Bengal state assembly election and had previously been an MLA from Hirapur constituency during the period of 2001–2006. He played an instrumental part and leading role in bringing about the creation of the new Paschim Bardhaman District, which is the 23rd district of West Bengal, with its headquarters at Asansol. Ghatak did his graduation with Political Science honours from Ananda Chandra College, Jalpaiguri and LLB from Calcutta University in 1982.

Legal career 
He is an Advocate by profession and usually practiced at Asansol Court and in the Labour Courts throughout the State. He is a third generation advocate.

References 

Living people
State cabinet ministers of West Bengal
West Bengal MLAs 2011–2016
West Bengal MLAs 2016–2021
1956 births
Jogesh Chandra Chaudhuri Law College alumni
University of Calcutta alumni
Trinamool Congress politicians from West Bengal